MK-434 is a 5α-reductase inhibitor which was under development in the 1990s by Merck & Co for the treatment of a variety of androgen-dependent conditions including benign prostatic hyperplasia, prostate cancer, pattern hair loss, excessive hair growth, acne, and seborrhea but was never marketed. It acts as a selective inhibitor of 5α-reductase type 2. The drug has been found to decrease circulating dihydrotestosterone levels by a maximum of approximately 50% in men. MK-434 is a synthetic 4-azasteroid and is structurally related to other 5α-reductase inhibitors like finasteride.

See also
 List of 5α-reductase inhibitors

References

External links
 MK-434 - AdisInsight

5α-Reductase inhibitors
Abandoned drugs
Androstanes
Anti-acne preparations
Hair loss medications
Hair removal
Hormonal antineoplastic drugs
Ketones
Prostate cancer